Abu al-Hasan al-Ahvazi was a Persian mathematician and astronomer of the 4th AH/10th CE and 5th AH/11th CE centuries. His name suggests that he was originally from Ahvaz, now in modern Iran. The Iranian scholar Al-Biruni mentioned his name in his works, an indication that Ahvazi's works were considered to be important. Ahvazi mentioned the Iranian astronomer and mathematician Abū Ja'far al-Khāzin in one of his books. Since Al-Khazin died in 360 AH ( CE), it can be concluded that the final years of Ahvazi's life was contemporaneous to Biruni's childhood. 

Ahvazi's book  is extant. 

, a work previously attributed to another author, was probably written by Abū l-Ḥasan al-Ahwazi (d. 428/1037) It contains eight chapters of original sayings that were intended to be understood as proverbs.

References

Sources
 

11th-century Iranian mathematicians
10th-century Iranian mathematicians
People from Ahvaz
10th-century Iranian astronomers
11th-century Iranian astronomers
Astronomers of the medieval Islamic world